Henryk Hektor Siemiradzki (24 October 1843 – 23 August 1902) was a Polish painter. He spent most of his active creative life in Rome. Best remembered for his monumental academic art. He was particularly known for his depictions of scenes from the ancient Greek-Roman world and the New Testament, owned by many national galleries of Europe.<ref name="culture.pl">Ewa Micke-Broniarek, Henryk Siemiradzki. Magazine "Culture.pl". National Museum, Warsaw, December 2004.</ref>

Many of his paintings depict scenes from antiquity, often the sunlit pastoral scenes or compositions presenting the lives of early Christians. He also painted biblical and historical scenes, landscapes, and portraits. His best-known works include monumental curtains for the Lviv (Lwów) Theatre of Opera and for the Juliusz Słowacki Theatre in Kraków.

Biography
Siemiradzki was born to Hipolit Siemiradzki, a Polish noble and an officer of the Imperial Russian Army (made general in 1871) and Michalina (née Prószyńska) in Belgorod (now Chuhuiv Raion, Kharkiv oblast, Ukraine),Stanisław Lorentz. The National Museum in Warsaw: painting. Arkady Publishers. 1990. p. 50. near the city of Kharkiv, where his father's regiment was stationed. 
The family had origins in Radom land and derived its name from the village of Siemiradz. One of the branches settled near Navahrudak (Nowogródek) in the late 17th century. Henryk's grandfather held the post of podkomorzy in Nowogródek powiat. His parents were close friends with Adam Mickiewicz's family. He studied at Kharkiv Gymnasium where he first learned painting under the local schoolteacher, D.I. Bezperchy, a former student of Karl Briullov. He entered the physics-mathematics school of Kharkiv University and studied natural sciences there with great interest, but also continued to paint.Tomasz Rozum,  Henryk Hektor Siemiradzki. Magazyn Informator. No. 89, 2006.

Siemiradzki's artistic career

After graduating from university with a Kandidat degree he abandoned his scientific career and moved to Saint Petersburg to study painting at the Imperial Academy of Arts from 1864 to 1870. Upon his graduation he was awarded a gold medal. In 1870–1871 he studied under Karl von Piloty in Munich on a grant from the Academy. In 1872 he moved to Rome and later built a studio there on Via Gaeta, while spending summers at his estate in Strzałków near Częstochowa.

In 1873 he received the title of Academician of the Imperial Academy of Arts for his painting Christ and a Sinner, based on a verse Sinner written by Aleksey Tolstoy. In 1878 he received the French National Order of the Legion of Honour and a gold medal at the Paris World's Fair for the painting Flower Vase. In 1876–1879 Siemiradzki worked on frescoes for the Cathedral of Christ the Saviour (Moscow) among his other large-scale projects. In 1879 he offered one of his best-known works, the enormous Pochodnie Nerona (Nero's torches), painted around 1876, to the newly formed Polish National Museum. The artwork is on display at the Siemiradzki Room of the Sukiennice Museum in the Kraków Old Town, the most popular branch of the museum. Around 1893 Siemiradzki worked on two large paintings for the State Historical Museum (Moscow) and in 1894 produced his monumental curtain for the Juliusz Słowacki Theatre in Kraków.

He died in Strzałków in 1902 and was buried originally in Warsaw, but later his remains were moved to the national Pantheon on Skałka in Kraków.

Siemiradzki modern arts gallery
The modern arts gallery at V.N. Karazin Kharkiv National University in Kharkiv, is named after Siemiradzki.

Siemiradzki's monumental paintings
Siemiradzki's large-scale canvasses, including The Sword Dance'' influenced by the French Académie des Beaux-Arts, are on display at the national museums of Poland, Russia, and Ukraine; notably, at the Sukiennice Museum, the National Museum, Poznań, Lviv National Art Gallery, Tretyakov Gallery, and others.

See also
List of Polish painters

Notes and references

External links

Online gallery of Semiradsky paintings
Works and Bio 
Bio 

1843 births
1902 deaths
People from Kharkiv Oblast
People from Kharkov Governorate
People from the Russian Empire of Polish descent
19th-century Polish painters
19th-century Polish male artists
20th-century Polish painters
20th-century Polish male artists
Academic art
National University of Kharkiv alumni
Recipients of the Legion of Honour
Expatriates from the Russian Empire in Italy
Polish male painters